Tiresias was a blind prophet in Greek mythology.

Tiresias may also refer to:

 Tiresias (ballet), by Constant Lambert
 Tiresias (horse)
 Tiresias (typeface)
 Teiresias algorithm
 Tirésias Simon Sam (1835–1916), President of Haiti
 Tom Driberg (1905–1976), pseudonymously Tiresias, British journalist, politician, and crossword compiler